Detmold is a city in Germany.

Detmold may also refer to:

 Detmold (region) in Germany
 Detmold, Maryland, a location in the United States
 Detmold (packaging), an Australian packaging company
 Detmold (surname)

See also
Detmold child, a mummy of a child found in Peru now held at Lippisches Land Museum in Detmold, Germany